Olivaichthys cuyanus is a species of velvet catfish endemic to Argentina where it is found in the Colorado River and tributaries as well as the Desaguadero-Salado basin.  It grows to a length of  SL.

References 
 

Olivaichthys
Fish of South America
Freshwater fish of Argentina
Endemic fauna of Argentina
Fish described in 1965